Perlican may refer to:

 New Perlican, Newfoundland and Labrador, Canada
 Old Perlican, Newfoundland and Labrador